The Angels' Share is a 2012 comedy-drama film directed by Ken Loach and starring Paul Brannigan, John Henshaw, and William Ruane. Set in Glasgow, Scotland, it tells the story of a young father who narrowly avoids a prison sentence. He is determined to turn over a new leaf and when he and his friends from the same community payback group visit a whisky distillery, a route to a new life becomes apparent. The title is from "the angels' share", a term for the portion (share) of a whisky's volume that is lost to evaporation during aging in oak barrels.

Plot

In the opening scenes, the protagonists are sentenced to hours of community payback. During his first community payback session, Robbie (Paul Brannigan), under the guidance of Harry (John Henshaw), is interrupted and taken to the hospital by Harry as his girlfriend, Leonie (Siobhan Reilly), has gone into labour. At the hospital, Robbie is assaulted by two of his girlfriend's uncles and her dad (Gilbert Martin) before he can see her. Harry takes Robbie back to his house to clean him up, at which point Leonie calls to announce Robbie's son, Luke, has been born. Harry insists that he and Robbie celebrate, and brings out a vintage whisky. With Leonie's encouragement, Robbie agrees to meet with a victim of his former violent crimes, Anthony (Roderick Cowie), who recollects the attack in front of both his family and Leonie. Afterwards, Leonie makes clear that she does not want her son to grow up around violence and long-term feuds.

Harry takes the group to a distillery as a reward for their good behaviour, where they learn what "the angels' share" is. Afterwards, the tour guide gives them each a dram of whisky and asks them to smell it, and Robbie is complimented on his ability to identify flavours.
Mo (Jasmin Riggins) steals several miniatures from the gift shop.
Robbie, Mo, Rhino (William Ruane) and Albert (Gary Maitland) get together later for their own whisky tasting with the stolen miniatures.

However, Robbie is still being pursued by his old enemy, Clancy (Scott Kyle). He is about to undergo a beating by Clancy and his followers when he is unexpectedly rescued by Leonie's father. Robbie pleads to be given one last chance but the older man tells him that it's too late, and even if he wanted to change, he cannot escape the feuds and violence of the world he grew up in. Leonie's father tells him that the only way for him to escape the cycle is to leave Glasgow altogether and go to London, but without Leonie. He offers Robbie £5,000 to sweeten the deal and leaves Robbie to think it over.

At the next community service session, Harry asks Robbie if he'd like to come to a whisky tasting in Edinburgh.
Mo overhears and invites herself, Albert and Rhino.
Reluctantly, Harry agrees to take all four of them to Edinburgh, where they learn about a cask of priceless whisky, the Malt Mill, set to go on auction soon, and Robbie is passed a business card by a whisky collector, Thaddeus (Roger Allam).
After they leave, Mo reveals she spotted and stole documents detailing the warehouse in which the "Malt Mill" is kept but Robbie tells her that he is not interested in crime and is determined to stay straight for the sake of Leonie and Luke.

Robbie and Leonie view a flat which they could rent for six months while the owner is away. Robbie seems touched but it is then revealed they have been followed by one of Clancy's men and Clancy will know where they are going to live. Robbie, realising that he can't continue living under threat of assault on himself and his family, begins planning to steal the Malt Mill with his community service partners. They secure an invitation to the tasting and auction, during which Robbie slopes off to the warehouse to siphon some of the whisky into empty Irn-Bru bottles, before he is interrupted by Thaddeus and Angus Dobie (David Goodall). Robbie covertly witnesses Thaddeus attempting to bribe Dobie into selling him some of the whisky before the cask goes on auction but he refuses and the two leave, after which Robbie then tops up the cask with cheaper whisky from an adjacent cask. At the auction, the group see Thaddeus outbid by an American, who tastes the cask, and is apparently happy with the slightly diluted blend.

Afterwards, Robbie approaches Thaddeus and negotiates a sale of three bottles for £200,000, and "a real job". They plan to make the exchange in Glasgow, and so begin the trek home, but inadvertently break two of their four bottles during an encounter with the police. Robbie is furious, but goes ahead with meeting Thaddeus, and negotiates a sale for £100,000 and a permanent job far away from Glasgow. Afterwards, Robbie reveals to his friends that he didn't sell two bottles, but one. The scene cuts to show Harry coming home to find a bottle of Irn Bru sitting on his kitchen table next to an open window, with a note thanking him for giving him a chance, and not giving up on him and presenting his "angels' share", next to a newspaper piece showing a photo of the community payback group next to the cask. He smells the bottle and rejoices gleefully at the Malt Mill inside.

In the final scene, we see Robbie and Leonie leave for Stirling in an immaculate old Volkswagen Type 2, having made temporary goodbyes to the rest of the group. After they leave, the rest of the group resolve to go get wasted. The film ends with The Proclaimers' "500 Miles" playing.

Cast
 Paul Brannigan as Robbie
 John Henshaw as Harry
 Gary Maitland as Albert
 Jasmin Riggins as Mo
 William Ruane as Rhino
 Roger Allam as Thaddeus
 David Goodall as Dobie
 Siobhan Reilly as Leonie
 Roderick Cowie as Anthony
 Scott Kyle as Clancy
 Neil Leiper as Sniper	
 Gilbert Martin as Matt

Production
The film was produced by Sixteen Films, Why Not Productions and Wild Bunch. It was backed financially by the BFI, Les Films du Fleuve, Urania and France 2 Cinéma. Filming in Glasgow and Edinburgh started 25 April 2011.

Release
The film competed for the Palme d'Or at the 2012 Cannes Film Festival, and Loach won the Jury Prize. It is Loach's 11th film in 31 years to compete at the French festival. Entertainment One acquired the distribution rights for the United Kingdom and Ireland, where the film went on general release on 1 June.

Critical reception
The Angels' Share was met with critical acclaim. Film review aggregator Rotten Tomatoes reports that 89% of critics gave the film a positive review, based on a sample of 101 reviews, with a rating average of 7.1 out of 10. On Metacritic, the film received a score of 66 based on 26 reviews, indicating "generally favorable reviews". The film was nominated for the Magritte Award for Best Foreign Film in Coproduction and at the 2012 Cannes Film Festival won the Jury Prize (the third-most prestigious prize at the film festival).

Home media
Entertainment One released The Angels' Share on Blu-ray Disc and DVD on 24 September 2012, in the United Kingdom.

See also
 Cinema of Scotland
 Cinema of France

References

External links 
 
 
 
 
 
 

2012 films
2012 in Scotland
2012 comedy-drama films
Belgian comedy-drama films
British comedy-drama films
2010s English-language films
English-language Scottish films
English-language Belgian films
English-language French films
English-language Italian films
Films scored by George Fenton
Films about alcoholic drinks
Films directed by Ken Loach
Films set in Edinburgh
Films set in Glasgow
Films shot in Argyll and Bute
Films shot in Edinburgh
Films shot in Glasgow
Films shot in Highland (council area)
French comedy-drama films
British heist films
Italian comedy-drama films
Scots-language films
Scottish comedy films
2010s British films
2010s French films